Mary S. Hooper (born Heidelberg, Germany) is an American politician and civic leader from the state of Vermont.  She is a second-term member of the Vermont House of Representatives representing the Washington-5 Representative District.

She served four 2-year terms as mayor of Montpelier, the capital city of Vermont.

Hooper was first elected mayor in 2004 and was re-elected in 2006, 2008, and 2010.   Although Montpelier's municipal elections are non-partisan, Hooper was elected as a Democrat to the Vermont state legislature in 2008.

Hooper did not run for reelection as Mayor in 2012 and was succeeded by John Hollar.

Notes

External links
 Washington-5 Representative District - Biographies (official state site)

Living people
Women mayors of places in Vermont
Mayors of Montpelier, Vermont
Women state legislators in Vermont
Democratic Party members of the Vermont House of Representatives
People from Montpelier, Vermont
21st-century American politicians
21st-century American women politicians
Year of birth missing (living people)